Cai Ming (born 21 October 1961) is a Chinese singer, actress, and sketch comedy performer.

Cai is notable for performing sketch comedy in CCTV New Year's Gala since 1991.

Biography
Cai was born into an educated family in Beijing on October 21, 1961, and she is of Hui ethnic group, the daughter of Tian Hua, a doctor, and Cai Yuping, a professor at Capital University of Economics and Business.

After graduating from junior high school, Cai entered the Beijing Film Studio Troupe.

In 1973, she starred in Xie Tieli's film Haixia, and this made her become famous overnight.

Cai performed sketch comedy in CCTV New Year's Gala since 1991.

Since July 2020, she has been working as a voice actress for Virtual YouTuber Nanako, who belongs to VirtuaReal Star.

Personal life
At the age of 22, Cai met her husband Ding Qiuxing, who is a Chinese director, they married in 1985, their son, Ding Ding, was born in July 1986.

Works

Discography
 Across, Cai Ming's debut studio album, was released on 1 January 2004.

Film

Television

CCTV New Year's Gala

Awards

References

External links

1961 births
Living people
21st-century Chinese actresses
20th-century Chinese actresses
Singers from Beijing
Chinese women singers
Chinese film actresses
Chinese television actresses
Actresses from Beijing
Hui actresses
Hui singers
Chinese stage actresses